Blind fly may refer to:

 One of several alternative names for the game of Blind man's bluff
 Common name for various species of blood-sucking flies in the family Tabanidae